St Margaret's Church of England Academy is a secondary school for boys (with a mixed sixth form) in Aigburth, Liverpool, England. It is frequently shortened to SMA.

Admissions
The school accepts 160 boys per year, and girls are accepted in years 12 and 13. St Margaret's Sixth Form is  part of the Faiths Partnership with fellow member schools St Hilda's Church of England High School, Archbishop Blanch School and Bellerive FCJ Catholic College.

The school is on Aigburth Road (A561) just north of Aigburth railway station in Aigburth, just east of Otterspool. It is next to the Church of St Anne, Aigburth (C of E) which is the local parish covering the school.

History

The school was founded by Alderman William Preston, one time Mayor of Liverpool, and the Vicar of St. Margaret's, Anfield, Reverend John Sheepshanks. The school opened in 1879 by the parish dignitary and MP for West Toxteth, Mr TB Royden. The school's first Headmaster was Mr E Crossley and an early teacher and benefactor was Mrs Gertrude Langton.

The school began as a Higher Grade School and after the 1918 Education Act, St Margaret's was recognised as a Central School with a selective intake based on a competitive examination. After the Education Act 1944, the school was restyled St. Margaret's Church of England School and during the 1950s courses leading to the GCE 'O' Level and 'A' Level examinations were established. In 1963 the school moved from Anfield to Aigburth. In the 1970s it had around 550 boys. In 1980 it was enlarged to a four-form entry school for students from 11 to 18 years of age. This was the year that the school had their first intake of girl students.

St Margaret's is a Church of England High School and was awarded Technology College status in 1997, and Specialist Language College status in 2008. The school increased its intake to five-form entry in September 1998. In September 2015 the school again increased its intake to six-form entry.

Academic performance
In 2019, the school's Progress 8 measure for GCSE was average. Attainment 8 score was above average. The proportion of children achieving Maths and English GCSEs was considerably above average. The proportion of children entering the English Baccalaureate was considerably lower than average. The average A level grade was C+, in line with the England average, and the average A level points score was 32, below the England average of 24. Attainment 8 score was above average.

As of 2022, the school's most recent inspection judgement from Ofsted was that the school requires improvement. in 2020, the report from ofsted was good and was confirmed by a short inspection in 2018.

Notable former pupils

 Gary Ablett, footballer
 Billy Ashcroft, footballer
 Kenneth Hesketh, composer
 Paul Horton, Lancashire cricketer
 Elliot Morley, Labour MP from 1997 to 2010 for Scunthorpe and from 1987 to 1997 for Glanford and Scunthorpe
 Mark Ramsden, musician, writer, composer
 Norman Sheil, cyclist (Anfield site)
 Stephen Tall (politician)
 Bill Tidy, cartoonist (at the Anfield site)
 Simon Jones, bass player, songwriter and musician in The Verve
 Bob Scott, footballer
 Dean Sullivan, actor, best known for his role as Jimmy Corkhill in Brookside

References

External links
 School's official website
 Streets of Culture
 EduBase

Boys' schools in Merseyside
Educational institutions established in 1879
Secondary schools in Liverpool
Church of England secondary schools in the Diocese of Liverpool
1879 establishments in England
Academies in Liverpool